The Buoys are an Australian alternative rock band formed in 2016. Since May 2019 the line-up has been Courtney Cunningham on bass guitar, Hilary Geddes on lead guitar, Tess Wilkin on drums and founding mainstay, Zoe Catterall on rhythm guitar and lead vocals. They have released three extended plays, Soft Boy (2017), All This Talking Gets Us Nowhere (2020) and Unsolicited Advice for Your DIY Disaster (2021), as well as several singles and they have toured nationally.

History 

The Buoys were formed in 2016, initially as a three-piece, by Zoe Catterall on rhythm guitar and lead vocals, Sophie Moroney on drums and Emily Jane on bass guitar hoping for more female musicians in their hometown, Cronulla, New South Wales. They played their first show with Ruby Fields ( Stay at Home Mum). Their five-track debut extended play, Soft Boy, appeared in November 2017. It was described by Dave McCarthy of Laundry Echo as a "furious debut five track from our new favourite queens of four to the floor punk songs."

McCarthy felt their debut single, "Liar Liar", displayed "an unrelenting onslaught of fuzzy guitars and bouncing drums that build a platform for nonchalant vocals to sound fed-up and fierce in equal measure upon." Come Here Floyd staff writer observed, "a fast paced dictation for love's complications and weird underpinnings. The ladies in the 3 piece band calmly fixates the right calculations towards why the complexity between one and his/her significant other. It's a challenge for sure."

During 2017 Emily Jane was replaced by Elle Moroney on bass guitar, who was replaced in turn by Roslyn Helper in 2018 and then by Courtney Cunningham later that year. Anthea Compton joined on lead guitar during 2018 and Tess Wilkin replaced Sophie Moroney on drums. The Buoys released a single, "Blues Point Road", in May 2018, which Catterall described as about "being left completely in the dark about someone’s intentions." Their following singles, "Arm Wrestle" (August) and "Make It Clear" (October) were stand-alone singles.

The Buoys had intended to release a second EP, Split Lip, but had a change of musical direction. The group released two singles in 2019, "Inside Outside" (April) and "Gold" (July). The line-up of Catterall, Cunningham, and Wilkin were joined by Hilary Geddes on lead guitar in May 2019. During that year the Buoys embarked on their first national tour, supporting DZ Deathrays, Polish Club and VOIID, before setting off on the 2019/2020 Australian festival circuit, playing at the likes of Fairgrounds, Farmer and the Owl and Festival of the Sun.

In February 2020, the Buoys played at the last-ever Party in the Paddock festival. They performed as support to Violent Soho at the Lansdowne Hotel. They were described by NMEs David James Young as "a band that has been asserting themselves as one of Sydney's great indie-rock hopes." The group were signed to Spunk! Records and issued their seventh single, "Wah", in April. Young observed, "[it] is one of the shortest and fastest songs the band has ever released – a throwback to mid-90s riot-grrrl and 80s punk." Hayden Davies of Pilerats felt the song was "a perfect example of their brilliance and the exact type of work they're putting out to ensure their space in tomorrow's music world."

The band released their second EP, All This Talking Gets Us Nowhere, in July 2020. They launched it with two sold-out shows at the Lansdowne Hotel in August 2020. They followed with a third EP, Unsolicited Advice for Your DIY Disaster, in October 2021. Chanel Issa of Hysteria Magazine highlighted the tracks, "Car Park", "Lie to Me Again" and "Drive Me Home" as stand-outs. During March and April 2023 the Buoys and Eliza & The Delusionals are due to co-headline an Australian east coast tour.

Band members

Current members
 Zoe Catterall – lead vocals, rhythm guitar , lead guitar 
 Tess Wilkin – drums, backing vocals 
 Courtney Cunningham – bass guitar, backing vocals 
 Hilary Geddes – lead guitar, backing vocals 

Past members
 Emily Jane – bass guitar, backing vocals 
 Sophie Moroney – drums 
 Ellie Moroney – bass guitar, backing vocals 
 Anthea Compton – lead guitar, backing vocals 
 Roslyn Helper – bass guitar, backing vocals 

Timeline

Hilary Geddes also plays with the indie rock/soul band Jackie Brown Jr, which includes rapper and drummer DOBBY.

Discography

Extended plays

Singles

References 

Australian alternative rock groups
All-female bands
Musical groups established in 2016
Year of birth missing (living people)
Musical groups from Sydney
2016 establishments in Australia